A Ginger snap is a hard gingerbread cookie.

Ginger snap or Ginger Snaps may refer to:
 Zu Zu Ginger Snaps, a discontinued brand of cookies
 Ginger Snap, a character from the 2003 revival of the Strawberry Shortcake cartoon series
 GingerSnaps (novel), a 2008 novel by Cathy Cassidy
 Ginger Snaps, Canadian horror film series consisting of:
 Ginger Snaps (film), 2000
 Ginger Snaps 2: Unleashed, a 2004 sequel
 Ginger Snaps Back: The Beginning, a 2004 prequel
 Ginger Snaps (TV series), a 2017 American adult animated sitcom web series about a teen cookie selling troop 
 Ginger Snaps, a 1989 episode of the Dynasty TV series

See also

 or